Muskegon Heights Academy High School is a public charter high school located in Muskegon Heights, Michigan.

Overview
Muskegon Heights High School is the only high school in the Muskegon Heights Public School Academy System (MHPSAS). The high school is known for its strong tradition in both athletics and the band program.

In February 2013, Mosaica was investigated for the illegal employment of uncertified teachers in its schools in Muskegon Heights. MHPSAS went on to become its own public charter school district.

Name change and transition
Following a transition, Muskegon Heights Public High School was changed to Muskegon Heights Academy High School, a charter school at the start of the 2012–2013 school year. It has since changed to Muskegon Heights Academy as of July 2014.

Demographics
Muskegon Heights High School is 95.6% Black, 1.4% White, 0.7% Asian, and 1.6% Hispanic. With a gender breakdown of 48.4% of females and 50.9% of males at this school.

Championships
Football
1945, 1946, 1947 1957

Basketball
1954, 1956, 1957, 1974, 1978, 1979

References

External links
 Muskegon Heights Public School Academy System

Educational institutions in the United States with year of establishment missing
Schools in Muskegon County, Michigan
Public high schools in Michigan
2012 establishments in Michigan